The Mae Klong, sometimes spelled Mae Khlong or Meklong, is a river in western Thailand. The river begins at the confluence of the Khwae Noi (Khwae Sai Yok) and the Khwae Yai River (Khwae Si Sawat) in Kanchanaburi, it passes Ratchaburi Province and empties into the Gulf of Thailand in Samut Songkhram Province.

The actual origin of the river is in the Tenasserim Hills, around the Khuean Srinagarindra National Park area in the north of Kanchanaburi Province. In its upper reaches, it feeds the giant Umphang Thee Lor Sue Waterfall.

Environment
The Mae Klong river basin has a tropical savanna climate, and is subject to two major thermal systems, the 
southwest and the northeast monsoons. The southwest monsoon brings moisture up from the Indian Ocean beginning in May and climaxing with heavy rains in September and October. These heavy rains are supplemented by cyclones out of the South China Sea during the same two months. The rising of the winds of the northeast monsoon bring an end to this rainfall. Almost 80% of the annual rainfall in the basin occurs in the half-year from May to October. Temperatures in the basin range from lows of 18 °C to highs of 38 °C.

Giant freshwater stingrays inhabit the river. A sudden die-off of forty-five of these rays in September 2016 threaten them with local extinction. Authorities have suspected that pollution was the cause of the die-off. It was later attributed to molasses waste water which leaked from a sugar/ethanol factory in Ban Pong District of Ratchaburi Province on 30 September that continued until 7 October. High levels of free ammonia killed the animals. The waste water has been reused by farms and not discharged into the environment. The Pollution Control Department will sue Rajburi Ethanol Co for allowing molasses wastewater to leak.

References

External links

Maeklong River - FishSiam.com
The Life at Mae Klong River Thailand
Time-travelling along the Mae Klong...

Rivers of Thailand
Geography of Kanchanaburi province
Geography of Ratchaburi province
Geography of Samut Songkhram province
Gulf of Thailand